Narendra Kumar may refer to:

Narendra Kumar (police officer) (1979–2012), Indian Police Service officer
Narendra Kumar (mountaineer) (1933–2020), Indian soldier-mountaineer
Narendra Kumar (politician)
Narendra Kumar (physicist) (1940-2017), Indian theoretical physicist